Andrei Belozerov (born June 17, 1977, Russia)  is a National FIDE Arbiter.He obtained International Master (IM) title in  1998 and Grandmaster (GM) title in 2002. He won the Siberian Championship in 2003, Tomsk Championship in 2004 and 2014.

Notable Tournaments

References 

1977 births
Living people
Russian chess players
Chess grandmasters